This is a list of events in Scottish television from 1977.

Events
14 March - 25th anniversary of BBC 1 Scotland.
June - Television coverage of the Silver Jubilee of Elizabeth II
31 August - 20th anniversary of Scottish Television.
December - The BBC Scotland Sports Personality of the Year is first awarded, and has been presented annually since.
Unknown -  is the first children's programme to be broadcast in Gaelic.

Television series
Scotsport (1957–2008)
Reporting Scotland (1968–1983; 1984–present)
Top Club (1971–1998)
Scotland Today (1972–2009)
Sportscene (1975–Present)
Garnock Way (1976–1979)
Public Account (1976–1978)

Births
29 July - Robert Florence, writer, presenter and comedian
1 December - Lee McKenzie, television presenter
Unknown - Rae Hendrie, actress

See also
1977 in Scotland

References

 
Television in Scotland by year
1970s in Scottish television